Mució Joseph Emmanuel Miquel (12 March 1902 – 27 May 1945), also known as Muç Miquel and Miguel Mucio, was a Catalan cyclist who most notably wo the Volta a Catalunya in 1924 and 1925 as well as the Spanish National Road Race Championships in 1927.

Major results

1923
 3rd Road race, National Road Championships
 5th Overall Volta a Catalunya
1924
 1st  Overall Volta a Catalunya
1st Stages 1 & 3
 9th Overall Tour of the Basque Country
1925
 1st  Overall Volta a Catalunya
1st Stage 1
1926
 2nd Overall Volta a Catalunya
 2nd Overall Vuelta a Asturias
 9th Overall Tour of the Basque Country
1927
 1st  Road race, National Road Championships
 1st Overall Vuelta a Asturias
1st Stage 1
 3rd GP Viscaya
1928
 1st Prueba Villafranca de Ordizia
 2nd Overall Volta a Catalunya

References

External links
 

1902 births
1945 deaths
Spanish male cyclists
Cyclists from Barcelona